The Mewati gharana (also known as the Jaipur-Mewati gharana, Jodhpur gharana, and Miyan Bande Ali Khan Beenkar gharana) is a musical apprenticeship tribe of Hindustani classical music. Known for being Pandit Jasraj's musical lineage, the gharana was founded by brothers Utd. Ghagge Nazir Khan and Utd. Wahid Khan (beenkar) of Indore in the late 19th century at the Holkar Court. Members of this gharana have had an active influence in Indian cinema for over half a century.

With its own distinct aesthetics, stylings, practices, and repertoire, the gharana emerged as an offshoot of the Khandarbani Dhrupad, Gwalior, and Qawwal Bacchon musical traditions. The gharana gained visibility in the late-20th century after Pt. Jasraj popularized the gayaki.

History
Ghagge Nazir Khan and Wahid Khan are regarded as fountainheads of the Mewati gharana. They were descendants of the Qawwal Bacchon gharana (Qawwal Bacchon Ka Gharana).

Etymology
The Mewati Gharana takes its name from the region between Delhi, Jaipur, and Indore where Ghagge Nazir Khan and Wahid Khan's family hailed, Mewat (not the Mewar region of Rajasthan).

Recent developments
Ghagge Nazir Khan passed on his musical tradition to his foremost disciples Munavvar Khan, Natthulal Pandit, Chimanlal Pandit, and Ghulam Qadir Khan. Natthulal passed the tradition onto his nephew, Motiram, who shared this tradition with his brother, Jyotiram, around the start of the 20th century. During this period, musicians of this gharana served under monarchical patronage as court musicians.

Jyotiram later became a disciple of Rajab Ali Khan, whose father, Manglu Khan, was a disciple of Bade Mohammed Khan and Bande Ali Khan (e.g. a member of the extended gharana). Motiram passed this tradition to his sons, Maniram and Pratap Narayan. After Motiram's unexpected demise, Maniram and Pratap Narayan were instrumental in grooming their younger brother, Jasraj, in the Mewati tradition after the latter renounced playing tabla, his primary training at the time. Jasraj was initially influenced by the music of Amir Khan and Begum Akhtar but later developed a separate style. He introduced new stylistic elements into the traditional Mewati style, following the romanticism started by Omkarnath Thakur and producing a more emotive, devotional, rhythmic-conscious, and lyric-conscious style.

Ancestry
Ghagge Nazir Khan and Wahid Khan inherited three traditions of classical music; Khandarbani dhrupad baaj and gayaki from their ancestors and then Qawwal Bacchon gayaki, Gwalior gayaki, Kirana baaj, and Dagarbani baaj from later gurus.

Mewati gayaki emerged from the first synthesis of the dhrupad and khayal traditions of music, through the inter-marriage of Bade Mohammed Khan's family with Haddu-Hassu Khan's family, which Ghagge Nazir Khan married into.

Bade Mohammed Khan, son of Shakkar Khan of Lucknow, emerged from the Qawwal Bacchon tradition. His son, Waris Ali Khan, married a daughter of Haddu Khan. Through their union, Bade Mohammed Khan acquired the status of being a Gwalior gharana exponent and was regarded for his "taan bazi" repertoire. Another offspring of Bade Mohammed Khan, Bade Mubarak Ali Khan, is said to have influenced Alladiya Khan's gayaki due to his proclivity for taans. Ghagge Nazir Khan married Bade Mubarak Ali Khan's daughter, learned from Waris Ali Khan, and learned from Chhote Mohammed Khan, Haddu Khan's son.

Due to politics and competition with Natthu Khan's family, Bade Mohammed Khan relocated to Rewa in Bhopal as the court musician of the maharaja. Consequently, Ghagge Nazir Khan and Wahid Khan are associated with the Bhopal region in musical literature.

Geography
Seeking musical patronage, their ancestors immigrated from their origins in Delhi and Gwalior, settling first in Bhopal and later western Rajasthan.

These migrations influenced new developments in the gharana's musical styles and aesthetics. Eventually, these changes resulted in the Mewati gayaki becoming distinct although reminiscent of the Gwalior and Qawwal Bacchon styles. Hence the gharana is considered both musically and genealogically different from these groups.

Pedagogical genealogy

Ancestry
The below illustration is based on the historical account provided by Siraj Khan.

Early pedagogy
A visual representation of Mewati gharana and its earlier roots.

Recent Pedagogy

Overview

Aesthetic approaches
Though the gayaki has roots in the style and trends of the Gwalior and Delhi, the Mewati gayaki has some distinct qualities. The Mewati gayaki emphasizes the importance of bhava and literature (bandish). The gayaki includes substantial use of sargam and tihai. In a crude sense, the approach to taan is similar to the Patiala gayaki and Tappa Gayaki in execution but is closer to the Gwalior gayaki in application.

The gayaki's meend applications have been regarded for their smoothness and naturalness.

Philosophy
Maniram and Jasraj have described the essential philosophy of the Mewati tradition as based on "shuddha vani" (pure sound), "shuddha mudra" (pure expression), and "shuddha sur" (pure notes).

Religious themes
Through Sufiana mausiqi and bhaktic influences, the Mewati gayaki includes theistic and spiritual elements, where religious verses from Hinduism and Shia Islam (especially Ismailism) are incorporated not only in the grammatical content of the music, but as intrinsic elements in melodic expression. Jaiwant Singhji and Jasraj contributed numerous devotional compositions to the gharana's repertoire.

Some contemporary compositions invoke the name and attributes of Aga Khan as the manifest Imam and the tenth incarnation of Lord Vishnu according to the dashavatara. The verse "Om Shri Anant Hari Naaraayañ" is typically invoked as the initiation of a performance, and as the grammatical medium for an alap.

Specialty ragas and compositions
The Mewati Gharana holds raags unique to its tradition. These include:
 Raag Jaiwanti Todi: A mixture of raags Ahir Bhairav and Todi, created by Jaiwant Singhji.
 Raag Jaiwant Sarang: A mixture of raags Jaijaiwanti and Sarang, created by Jaiwant Singhji.
 Raag Gyaankali: Inspired by Raag Gorakh Kalyan, created by Jaiwant Singhji.
 Raag Rajrajeshwari: Created by Jaiwant Singhji.
 Raag Bagkauns: Created by Jaiwant Singhji.
 Raag Din Ki Puriya
 Raag Audav Bageshree
 Raag Khamaj Bahar
 Raag Bhavani Bahar

Haveli Sangeet
Informed by the gharana's kirtankar tradition, Jasraj researched the haveli sangeet of Mathura and Brindavan. Consequently, many devotional compositions have been brought into the gharana's repertoire.

Exponents

19th century
 Wahid Khan (c. 1840 - 1933) was born to Imam Khan, a Khandarbani dhrupadiya, in Alwar. He learned rudra veena from Bande Ali Khan (Kirana and Dagarbani). He served as court musician to Indore State. Four of his children, Latif, Majid, Ghulam Qadir, and Hamid went on to become renowned musicians.
 "Ghagge" Nazir Khan (c. 1850 - c. 1920) was born to Imam Khan, a Khandarbani dhrupadiya, in Agra. He learned vocal music from Waris Ali Khan (Qawwal Bacchon and Chhote Mohammed Khan (Gwalior). He served as court musician to Jodhpur, Gwalior, and Bhopal states. He taught music to Pandit Natthhulal, Pandit Chimmanlal, Munavvar Khan (brother), and Ghulam Qadir Khan (nephew).
 Chimanlal Pandit (c. 1850s-c. 1890s), learned from Ghagge Nazir Khan.
 Natthulal Pandit (c. 1850s-c. 1920s), learned from Ghagge Nazir Khan.
 Munavvar Khan (c. 1860s-c. 1930s), learned from Ghagge Nazir Khan (primarily) and Wahid Khan.
 Majid Khan (c. 1880s-c. 1930s), first son and disciple of Wahid Khan, proficient in sitar and rudra veena.
 Latif Khan (c. 1880s-1935), second son and disciple of Wahid Khan, proficient in rudra veena. Succeeded his father as a court musician of Indore for the Holkar Dynasty.
 Begum Hasibanbai (c. 1880s-c. 1950s), daughter of Wahid Khan, mother of Mohammed Khan, grandmother of Rais Khan.
 Saddan Khan (c. 1890s-1940s), third son and disciple of Wahid Khan, proficient in sitar.
 Pandit Motiram (1889-1934), nephew and disciple of Natthulal Pandit. Father and guru of Motiram, Pratap Narayan, and Jasraj.
 Mohammed Shafi (c. 1900s-1979), son of Majid Khan, proficient in sitar, composed and arranged music in the Hindi film industry. Brother-in-law of Vilayat Khan.
 Pandit Jyotiram (1899-1944), younger brother and disciple of Pandit Motiram and Rajab Ali Khan. Father of Puranchand.

20th century
 Jaiwant Singhji Waghela (1904-1980), disciple of Munavvar Khan and Ghulam Qadir Khan, proficient in rudra veena and singing. Developed aptitude as a musicologist. Guru of Pandit Motiram, Pandit Pratap Narayan, and Pandit Jasraj.
 Mohammed Khan (c. 1900s-1967), son of Begum Hasibanbai and disciple of Latif Khan, proficient in rudra veena, sitar, and surbahar. Father of Rais Khan.
 Pandit Maniram (1910-1985), son and disciple of Pandit Motiram. Also learned from Pandit Jyotiram and Jaiwant Singhji Waghela. Guru and brother of Pratap Narayan and Jasraj. Father of Yogai Sharma, Vinod Pandit, and Dinesh Pandit.
 Ghulam Qadir Khan (1914-2002), second-youngest son of Wahid Khan, disciple of his father and uncle, Munavvar Khan. Proficient in singing and rudra veena. Musical guide to all junior musicians in the gharana, particularly Jaiwant Singhji Waghela, Pandit Motiram, Pandit Pratap Narayan, Pandit Jasraj, Siraj Khan, and Asad Khan. Former khalifa of the Mewati Gharana.
 Hamid Khan (c. 1900s-1970s), youngest son and disciple of Wahid Khan, proficient in rudra veena and sitar.
 Pandit Pratap Narayan (1918-2002), son and disciple of Pandit Motiram. Also learned from uncle, Pandit Jyotiram, and brother, Pandit Maniram.
 Krishnakant Parikh (1924-2018), first student of Pandit Jasraj. Guru of his two sons, Niraj and Vikas, and grandson, Akshat.
 Pandit Puranchandra (1929-1991), son and disciple of Pandit Jyotiram. Also learned from Ghulam Qadir Khan and Abdul Kadar Khan of Agra Gharana.
 Pandit Jasraj (1930-2020), son and disciple of Pandit Motiram. Learned primarily from brothers Pandit Maniram and Pandit Pratap Narayan. Also learned from Jaiwant Singhji Waghela, Ghulam Qadir Khan, and Swami Vallabhdas of Agra Gharana.
 Begum Kaniz Fatima (1934-2018), only daughter of Latif Khan. Mother of Siraj Khan.
 Mukund Lath (1937-2020), disciple of Pandit Motiram and Pandit Jasraj. Celebrated musicologist and historian.
 Rais Khan (1939-2017), son and disciple of Mohammed Khan, proficient in sitar and surbahar.
 Yogai Sharma (b. 1940), daughter and disciple of Pandit Maniram. Married Askaran Sharma.
 Begum Nilofer Khan (c. 1940s-c. 2010s), daughter and disciple of Mohammed Khan, proficient in sitar and surbahar. Also leaerned from Ghulam Qadir Khan.
 Shobha Abhyankar (1946-2014), disciple of Pandit Jasraj. Guru of her son, Sanjeev Abhyankar, and Sandeep Ranade. Also learnd from Gangadharbuwa Pimpalkhare and V. R. Athavale.
 Girish Wazalwar (b. 1947), disciple of Pandit Jasraj.
 Chandrashekhar Swami (b. 1940s), disciple of Pandit Jasraj. Also studied with Swami Vallabhdas.
 Asha Lohia (b. 1940s), disciple of Pandit Jasraj and sister-in-law of Mukund Lath.
 Vinod Pandit (1952-2001), son and disciple of Pandit Maniram who became an actor.
 Dinesh Pandit (b. 1956), son and disciple of Pandit Maniram, proficient in tabla and percussions. Also a music composer.
 Jatin Pandit (b. 1950s), son and disciple of Pandit Pratap Narayan. Acclaimed music composer for Hindi cinema. Collaborated with brother, Lalit.
 Lalit Pandit (b. 1950s), son and disciple of Pandit Pratap Narayan. Acclaimed music composer for Hindi cinema. Collaborated with brother, Jatin.
 Radharaman Kirtane (b. 1957), disciple of Pandit Jasraj.
 Siraj Khan (b. 1958), eldest son of Begum Kaniz Fatima, proficient in sitar. Learned from Vilayat Khan, Rais Khan, and Ghulam Qadir Khan. Current khalifa of the Mewati Gharana.
 Shahid Khan (b. c. 1950s), younger son of Begum Kaniz Fatima, proficient in violin. Active in Hindi film industry, working alongside R. D. Burman, Laxmikant-Pyarelal, Rajesh Roshan, and Anu Malik, among others.
 Madhup Mudgal (b. c. 1950s), disciple of Pandit Jasraj. Son and disciple of Vinay Chandra Maudgalya who also studied with Kumar Gandharva.
 Arawind Thatte (b. 1958), disciple of Pandit Jasraj, proficient in harmonium.
 Ramesh Narayan (b. 1959), disciple of Pandit Jasraj.
 Gargee Siddhant Dutta (b. 1960s), disciple of Pandit Jasraj.
 Tripti Mukherjee (b. 1960s), disciple of Pandit Jasraj.
 Shaarang Dev Pandit (b. 1963), son and disciple of Pandit Jasraj. Worked as a music composer in film and television.
 Durga Jasraj (b. 1964), daughter and disciple of Pandit Jasraj. Worked as a model, actress, and television host.
 Kala Ramnath (b. 1967), disciple of Pandit Jasraj, proficient in violin. Niece of N. Rajam and T. N. Krishnan.
 Lokesh Anand (b. 1978), disciple of Pandit Jasraj, proficient in Shehnai.
 Shweta Jhaveri (b. 1960s), disciple of Pandit Jasraj.
 Suman Ghosh (b. 1967), disciple of Pandit Jasraj.
 Hemang Mehta (b. 1968), disciple of Pandit Jasraj.
 Sanjeev Abhyankar (b. 1969), disciple of Pandit Jasraj. Son and disciple of Shobha Abhyankar. Also learned from Gangadharbuwa Pimpalkhare.
 Rattan Mohan Sharma (b. 1971), nephew and disciple of Pandit Jasraj.
 Gautam Kale (b. 1970s), disciple of Pandit Jasraj. Also learned from Vishwanath Rao Ringe.
 Dilip Gavaiya (b. 1978), son and disciple of Pandit Puranchandra.

21st century
 Sandeep Ranade (b. 1981), disciple of Pandit Jasraj and Shobha Abhyankar. Also learned from Anjali Joglekar-Ponkshe.
 Saptarshi Chakraborty (b. 1981), disciple of Pandit Jasraj.
 Pritam Bhattacharjee (b. 1981), disciple of Pandit Jasraj.
 Asad Khan (b. 1982), son and disciple of Siraj Khan, proficient in sitar.
 Shahraaz Khan (b. 1980s), son and disciple of Siraj Khan. Works as a composer and arranger for film and television.
 Amit Arya (b. 1980s), disciple of Asha Lohia, Hemang Mehta, Tripti Mukherjee, and Pandit Jasraj.
 Adwait Joshi (b. 1980s), disciple of Pritam Bhattacharjee.
 Ankita Joshi (b. 1988), disciple of Pandit Jasraj.
 Aditya Shah (b. 1994), disciple of Radharaman Kirtane and Rattan Mohan Sharma.
 Akshat Parikh (b. 1990s), disciple of Krishnakant Parikh. Works as a music supervisor for film and television.
 Swar Sharma (b. 2000), son and disciple of Rattan Mohan Sharma.
 Azaan Khan (b. 2000s), son and disciple of Asad Khan.

See also
 Music of Haryana

References

 
Vocal gharanas
Mewat
Rajasthani culture